Lay Down and Love It Live is the first (and currently only) live album by Sonia Dada. The album was released in 1999 on Calliope Records, and was reissued in 2002 by Razor & Tie. The album includes a cover version of Sly & the Family Stone's "I Want to Take You Higher".

Track listing
 Planes & Satellites
 Lester's Methadone Clinic
 I'm Gone
 Never See Me Again
 Amazing Jane  
 You Ain't Thinking (About Me)
 Anna Lee
 Last Parade (Crazy Lady)
 Phases Of The Moon  
 Don't Go (Giving Your Love Away)
 You Don't Treat Me No Good  
 I Want To Take You Higher  
 Goodnight

Sonia Dada albums
1999 live albums